Side by Side is a 2012 American documentary film directed by Christopher Kenneally. It was produced by Justin Szlasa and Keanu Reeves. It premiered at the 62nd Berlin International Film Festival and it was shown at the Tribeca Film Festival.

Synopsis 
The documentary investigates the history, process and workflow of both digital and photochemical film creation. It shows what artists and filmmakers have been able to accomplish with both film and digital and how their needs and innovations have helped push filmmaking in new directions. Interviews with directors, colorists, scientists, engineers and artists reveal their experiences and feelings about working with film and digital.

Cast 

 Keanu Reeves, actor
 John Malkovich, actor
Danny Boyle, director
 George Lucas, director, producer
 James Cameron, director
 David Fincher, director
 David Lynch, director
 Robert Rodriguez, director
 Martin Scorsese, director
 Steven Soderbergh, director
 The Wachowskis, directors
 Christopher Nolan, director
 Joel Schumacher, director
 Richard Linklater, director
 Lars von Trier, director
 Lena Dunham, director, actress
 Greta Gerwig, actress
 Caroline Kaplan, producer
 Lorenzo di Bonaventura, producer
 John Knoll, visual effects supervisor at Industrial Light & Magic
 Tim Webber
 Dennis Muren, special effects artist
 Bradford Young, cinematographer
 Craig Wood
 Derek Ambrosi, film editor
 Dion Beebe, A.C.S.
 Jost Vacano, A.C.S.

And many more. IMDB lists 69 cast members in total.

Reception 
Based on 68 reviews collected by Rotten Tomatoes, the film received a 93% approval rating from critics with an average score of 7.43/10. The website's critics consensus reads: "Keanu Reeves proves a groovy guide through this informative exploration of how technology is transforming cinema, with an even-handed defense for both the old and the new."

References

External links
 
 
 
 

2012 films
2012 documentary films
American documentary films
Documentary films about the visual arts
Documentary films about the film industry
2010s English-language films
2010s American films